Bronchales is a village and municipality located in the Sierra de Albarracín province of Teruel, Aragon, Spain. According to the 2004 census (INE), the municipality has a population of 463 inhabitants.

It is known for its mass of pine forests (one of the best preserved in Spain), which makes it a holiday resort for many families both in the community of Aragon and the neighboring Valencian Community.

It is located at 1,569 meters above sea level, being one of the highest villages in Spain. We can find great amount of fountains, whose waters are of recognized by their quality and extraordinary healthy properties.

References 

Municipalities in the Province of Teruel